The 1993 Monaco Grand Prix (formally the 51e Grand Prix de Monaco) was a Formula One motor race held at Monaco on 23 May 1993. It was the sixth race of the 1993 Formula One World Championship.

The 78-lap race was won by Brazilian driver Ayrton Senna, driving a McLaren-Ford. It was Senna's fifth consecutive Monaco win and sixth in all, breaking the record set by British driver Graham Hill in 1969. Hill's son Damon finished second in a Williams-Renault, with Frenchman Jean Alesi third in a Ferrari. Senna also equalled the all-time record for wins at a single F1 Grand Prix.

Summary
Prost took pole ahead of Schumacher, Senna, Hill, Alesi and Patrese. Prost jumped the start with Berger getting ahead of Patrese. The order was: Prost, Schumacher, Senna, Hill, Alesi and Berger. 

At St. Devote on the first lap as ever there was a scrap as Blundell's Ligier was forced wide off the track and eventually retired after spinning into the wall with suspension damage. Then Prost was penalised for the jump start with a stop-go penalty. He went on lap 12 but stalled the car as he was trying to exit. Finally the problem was fixed but he was a lap down and in 22nd. Wendlinger in the Sauber made contact with JJ Lehto and eventually Lehto retired in the pits by lap 24 with collision damage. Schumacher, now leading, pulled away as Alesi waved through teammate Berger. Schumacher, comfortably ahead, suddenly slowed down with a hydraulic problem on lap 33 and retired in a cloud of smoke at Loews. The main entertainment was provided by Prost as he climbed up the field despite difficult overtaking at the Monaco street circuit. 

It was time for the stops with no changes in the top 6 but Prost was the big gainer as he climbed from 10th to 7th. This became 6th and into the points when Patrese's engine failed on lap 54. Prost passed Fittipaldi for fifth soon after. Herbert crashed out on the main straight with gearbox problems on lap 62 which he subsequently had for 20 laps. On lap 71, Berger attacked Hill and there was contact. Hill rejoined but Berger was out immediately. Senna won from Hill, Alesi, Prost, Fittipaldi and Brundle.

Classification

Qualifying

Race

Championship standings after the race

Drivers' Championship standings

Constructors' Championship standings

References

Monaco Grand Prix
Monaco Grand Prix
Grand Prix
Monaco Grand Prix